Croydon FC, formerly known as Croydon Kings, is an Australian semi-professional soccer club in Adelaide, South Australia. Croydon FC currently competes in the National Premier Leagues South Australia. They play home games at Polonia Reserve at Croydon in Adelaide's inner northern suburbs. They are one of the most successful sides in South Australian soccer. The club's ethnic background is Polish Australian and the club was founded as the Polonia Adelaide Sports Club on 16 June 1950 by Alek Cmielewski and Karol Metanomski.

History

Early years
The club entered the 3rd division of the SASFA competition in 1952 and won the championship in its first year. They recruited 3 key players from their Polish rival being Izydor Sierocinski, Jerry Demczuk and Stanislaw Czerkawski for the clearance fee of £2.

They remained unbeaten throughout 1952 with the following statistics: 136 goals for, 18 against (aggregate). Stan Czerkawski scored 41 goals that season.

They are the only team in history to have done so. In the same year Polonia became the first 3rd division team to win the Association Cup after beating 1st division sides Juventus and Sturt before beating another 1st division side Beograd 3–1 in the final.

In 1954 while still in the 2nd division Polonia created another piece of history when they beat Juventus 3–1 in the final of the Association Cup to become the only team to have the cup twice while outside the 1st division.

1955 was another great year for Polonia. The club recruited John Kerr from Port Thistle and In its first season in Division One Polonia took out another Premiership, losing only 2 of its 18 matches. Polonia also reached the Cup Final in 1955. John Kerr scored 36 goals and led the club scoring for the next 3 years.  Polonia then finished 4th in 1956, runners-up in both 1957 and 1958, and then 4th again in 1959 before a decline commenced.

In 1960–9th, then 7th in 1961 and 6th in 1962. In 1962 Polonia imported four players from Poland-Katolik, Kreft (Edmund left Polonia in the 1970s and assisted Adelaide City in entering the NSL with great success), Gumowski and Szczurzynski. Despite a minor revival in 1963, when the club finished fourth, Polonia was finally relegated to the Second Division in 1964 when it finished last. In many respects relegation in 1964 proved a blessing in disguise. It took the opportunity to completely rebuild its Senior team. In 1965, it won the John Martin Cup and bounced back again into the First Division and won the Jaxen Cup-the Second Division Premiership. In 1966 Polonia welcomed the arrival of Typek, Manka, Nowak and Paprotny from Poland which assisted us in winning the Federation Cup, the Bailetti Cup and the Ampol night series! What a year! The former Division 1 player with Gwardia Warsaw Eugene Nowak at the age of 30 was appointed the player-coach of Polonia. A number of Polonia players including Eugene Novak revelled in playing against Manchester United on 27/6/67 against the likes of Denis Law, Bobby Charlton Nobby Stiles and Brian Kidd. Eugene won the West End Medal and the club added to its trophy cabinet this year with the club winning the Savings Bank Shield in 1967 and the Ampol Cup. Led by Eugene in 1968 Polonia went one further winning the Federation Cup, the Junior Cup, the Savings Bank Shield and the Singlehurst Shield then in 1969 the club slumped to 7th in the League.

The arrival of three more of Polonia's imports namely Zdebel, Cygan and Poloczek saw the club win the First Division Premiership and the Federation Cup. 1975 saw the club take out the Wills Cup and become the South Australian Champions. In the Inaugural year of the National Soccer League, Polonia took out 3 major honours-the First Division Title, the Coca-Cola Cup and the Ampol Cup. Much of the credit for the 1977 triumph go to the Player-Coach Jan Mszyca who was recruited from Poland's top side-L.K.S. Lodz towards the end of 1976. Jan's presence was felt when Polonia then took out the Ampol Cup again in 1978.

1980s
In 1981 Polonia was runner up in the league and also reached the Federation Cup Final. In February 1982 Jan Kierno arrived from Poland and the senior team was runner up in the league, the reserve and junior teams won their respective Premierships. In 1983 Adam Karpinski arrived from Poland and the senior team finished third, Reserves fourth and the Juniors again won their Premiership. The Senior team however did win the Coca-Cola Cup and Jan Kierno won the Rothmans medal. After sliding down the table in 1984, Polonia contracted a Professional Coach from Poland, W Obrebski, who would solve the coaching problem which had existed at the club over the last few years. Then suddenly a few months later in January 1985, to the shock of everybody in the league, Obrebski was killed in a car accident. Despite the heavy blow and in his honour, the senior team finished fourth but won the Coca-Cola Cup. The Reserves team however did win the Bailetti Cup. In 1987 the senior team finished sixth and the Reserves team finished second. 1986 saw the senior team finish eighth, reserves fifth and the Juniors fourth. David Doorne Captain of the senior team did however did win the Rothmans Medal. In 1988 the club contracted Professional Coach Z Gutowski and three further players from Poland-M Niewiadomski, P Wieczorek and E Lonka. The senior team finished seventh, the Reserves fourth and the Juniors fifth. M Niewiadomski finished the season as the League's Top Scorer and won $1000 and the Bianco Award for his season tally of 16 goals.

Modern era
1993 saw the implementation of the U23 team replacing the Reserves and the removal of ethnic names from the league. Hence the teams were known as Croydon Kings. The senior team finished 9th in the new competition.

After playing Enfield City for the Minor Premiership in 2002 with the new name of the Croydon Kings, the team spurred on and watched with over 2000 spectators won not only an epic encounter to re-enter the Premier league in its first attempt, but also the State League Championship.
 Croydon Kings then reformed both on and off the field. Its logo became the famous Sirena but this time with a soccer ball replacing the traditional shield. Mickey Doyle led the club in 2004 but resigned for personal reasons mid season. The club Chairman Greg Sierocinski, then recruited former Adelaide City player and former Socceroo Joe Mullen, who just finished coaching Green Gully in the Victorian Super League.

In 2007 and led by Paul Schillabeer, Polonia won the Best Premier League and secured promotion to the Best Super League (Division). In 2008 they finished bottom in their first season and were demoted back to the Premier League (2nd Division).

In 2010 Polonia won the Premier League Grand final Play-off series defeating Modbury Jets 2–1 in the final at Hindmarsh Stadium to secure promotion to the Super League. The following year the club finished 8th and avoided relegation back to the Premier League after managing a number of draws towards the end of the season, most notably a 1–1 draw against Adelaide City in the last round of the season denying them the Minor Premiership. On 1 September 2011, it was announced that the new senior team coach for the 2012 season would be club legend John Kosmina. However, on 18 December 2011, before having even been in charge of one senior game, he left the club to coach A-League club Adelaide United, he was replaced by Mark Brazzale.

On 11 August 2012 the club won the FFSA Super League premiership finishing top of the table after defeating Adelaide Comets 1–0 at Polonia Reserve. The only goal of the game coming in the second half through number 15, Luke Air. On 13 September 2014 the club was crowned champions of the 2014 National Premier Leagues South Australia by defeating North Eastern MetroStars SC 2–1. The clubs recent success continued when they lifted the 2015 FFSA Federation Cup trophy after defeating Adelaide City 2–0 in the final with both goals scored by striker Andreas Wiens. The cup win also secured the clubs berth into the 2015 FFA Cup however the club was bundled out of the tournament in the round of 32 by Brisbane based side Queensland Lions FC.

At the conclusion 2017 FFSA season, and after placing 4th on the league table Croydon qualified to take part in the 2017 finals series. After defeating West Adelaide, Adelaide Comets and MetroStars the side came up against minor premiership winners Adelaide City in a game played on 9 September 2017 at Hindmarsh Stadium. Courtesy of two-second half goals from strikers Paul Radice and Shaun McGreevy the club claimed its second NPL SA championship title with a 2–1 win. 17-year-old Croydon player Hosine Bilty was named man of the match.

The Kings advanced to the 2018 FFSA Federation Cup final after defeating Modbury Jets 1–0. They will face Adelaide Comets in the final for a spot in the Round of 32 of the 2018 FFA Cup. The club subsequently lost in the final 2–1.

Honours
 National Premier Leagues South Australia
Champions (2): 2014, 2017

 Super League
Premier (1): 2012

 Premier League
Champions (2): 2007, 2010

 1st Division
Champions (3): 1955, 1975, 1977

 2nd Division
Champions (2): 1965, 2002

 Third Division
Premiers (1): 1952

 FFA Cup
Round of 32 (1): 2015

 Federation Cup
Winners (7): 1952, 1954, 1966, 1968, 1975, 2000, 2015

 Ampol Cup
Winners (4): 1966, 1973, 1977, 1978

 Coca-Cola Cup
Winners (4): 1977, 1978, 1983, 1985

 Bailetti Cup
Winners (4): 1966, 1970, 1979, 1985

Current squad

References

External links
 Official Website

National Premier Leagues clubs
Soccer clubs in South Australia
Association football clubs established in 1950
1950 establishments in Australia
Polish sports clubs in Australia
Polish association football clubs outside Poland